Blast Premier (stylized as BLAST Premier) is a Counter-Strike: Global Offensive (CSGO) professional esports league launched in 2020. It is primarily based in two regions: North America and Europe. The series is divided into two seasons, the Spring and Fall season. Each season lasts around four months with 12 regular season teams participating in the Group stage, ending with a season finals for the 6 top teams from the group stage. The season finals are also open to two teams from each season's Showdown events, which are open to a much broader array of organizations, including those that did not advance in the regular season. The winner of each season's finals goes on to participate the Global Finals at the end of the year, as well as winners of other prestigious non-BLAST Premier events and those that rank highest in the BLAST Premier Global Leaderboard, a standings of the top events of the year from multiple leagues and tournaments. The Danish esports organisation, RFRSH Entertainment, announced the series as a successor to the BLAST Pro Series in 2019. The 2020 Blast Premier Series experienced disruptions due to the COVID-19 Pandemic, including the transition of all events except the Spring regular season online and reduced prize pools for many of the events. This disruption continued into the 2021 season, with both the Spring Groups and Spring Showdown occurring online, though all other events are currently planned to be held offline. In March 2021, they announced cryptocurrency exchange platform Coinbase as its latest sponsor for the competition's ongoing Spring Season. They also partnered with Danish gaming chair manufacturer L33T Gaming.

Editions

World Team Of The Year

References

External links 

 Official website

2020 in esports
Esports leagues
Esports television series
Counter-Strike competitions